Lolium temulentum, typically known as darnel, poison darnel, darnel ryegrass or cockle, is an annual plant of the genus Lolium within the family Poaceae. The plant stem can grow up to one meter tall, with inflorescence in the ears and purple grain. It has a cosmopolitan distribution.

Growth

Darnel usually grows in the same production zones as wheat and was a serious weed of cultivation until modern sorting machinery enabled darnel seeds to be separated efficiently from seed wheat. The similarity between these two plants is so great that in some regions, darnel is referred to as "false wheat". It bears a close resemblance to wheat until the ear appears. The spikes of L. temulentum are more slender than those of wheat. The spikelets are oriented edgeways to the rachis and have only a single glume, while those of wheat are oriented with the flat side to the rachis and have two glumes. Wheat will appear brown when ripe, whereas darnel is black.

Darnel can be infected by an endophytic fungus of the genus Neotyphodium and the endophyte-produced, insecticidal loline alkaloids were first isolated from this plant.

The French word for darnel is ivraie (from Latin ebriacus, intoxicated), which expresses the drunken nausea from eating the infected plant, which can be fatal. The French name echoes the scientific name, Latin temulentus "drunk."

Literary references

The ancient Greek botanist Theophrastus stated in his De causis plantarum (8:7 §1) that wheat can transform (metaballein) into darnel (aira), since fields sown to wheat are often darnel when reaped.

 Darnel is mentioned in Horace's Satire 2.6 (eaten by the Country mouse while he serves his guest fancier foods) 

 Darnel may have been the plant in the Parable of the Tares in the Gospel of Matthew:

 In ordering the St. Brice's Day massacre of all the Danes in England, Æthelred the Unready observed that "all the Danes who had sprung up in this island, sprouting like cockle amongst the wheat, were to be destroyed by a most just extermination."
 Darnel is also mentioned as a weed in Shakespeare's King Lear.
 Darnel is one of the many ingredients in mithridate, which Mithridates, the king of ancient Pontus, is supposed to have used every day to render him immune to poisoning.
 Darnel is mentioned in the Mishnah in Kilayim (1:1) as זונין, similar to the Arabic زؤان.

See also
 Bromus tectorum

References

External links
"Wheat’s Evil Twin Has Been Intoxicating Humans For Centuries", Atlas Obscura, March 22, 2016

Pooideae
Medicinal plants
Plants described in 1753
Taxa named by Carl Linnaeus
Flora of Malta